The Minister of Education was a member of the Executive Committee of the Privy Council of Northern Ireland (Cabinet) in the Parliament of Northern Ireland which governed Northern Ireland from 1921 to 1972.

Parliamentary Secretary to the Ministry of Education
1921 – 1925 Robert McKeown
1925 – 1937 John Hanna Robb
1937 – 1944 Dehra Parker
1944 – 1967 vacant
1967 – 1968 Roy Bradford

Office abolished 1968

See also
 Department of Education (Northern Ireland), modern devolved department

References
The Government of Northern Ireland

1921 establishments in Northern Ireland
1972 disestablishments in Northern Ireland
Executive Committee of the Privy Council of Northern Ireland